WWCK-FM (105.5 MHz, "CK105.5") is a radio station in Flint, Michigan, broadcasting a Top 40 (CHR) format. The station is owned by Cumulus Media and has programmed its current format since 1989.  Its studios are located south of the Flint city limits and its transmitter is east of downtown Flint near the intersection of Dort Highway and Interstate 69.

History

Early history: WMRP
105.5 FM originally went on the air in 1964 as WMRP-FM.  The WMRP calls stood for Methodist Radio Parish.  WMRP-FM aired a beautiful music format while WMRP 1570 played MOR; the conservative owners of the stations prohibited any advertising for tobacco or alcohol products.

WWCK is born as FM 105 Flint's Best Rock
In 1971, the United Methodist Church withdrew support for WMRP-AM-FM, and the stations were sold that year to John W. Nogaj, who changed the FM's call letters to WWCK in November 1971 as a tribute to Windsor, Ontario's powerhouse CKLW and installed a daytime Top 40 and nighttime AOR format. As AM 1570 they went Country and later Oldies as WCZN.

John sold WCZN and WWCK in 1975 to Reams Broadcasting who changed WWCK's format in October 1975 to full time AOR. As "WWCK FM 105, Flint's Best Rock" and then as "WWCK FM 105, Rock Of The Eighties". WWCK-FM was a market leader in Flint for many years, and it was named as the top rated rock station in all of the United States in 1985, WWCK-FM was also the home of WWCK's DJ turned-filmmaker Michael Moore's Sunday night show "Radio Free Flint" from 1980 through 1985 and "Buffalo Dick's Radio Ranch" with Jeffrey Lamb and future voice actor himself Robert Paulsen was voted as "The Best Local Programming In All Markets" by Billboard Magazine in 1982.

WWCK goes into CHR/Top 40 as CK 105 FM
In December 1988, Reams Broadcasting sold WWCK-AM 1570 and WWCK-FM 105.5 to Majac of Michigan, On January 1, 1989, Majac officially changed WWCK-FM's format from an AOR station to a CHR/Top 40 station as "The All New CK 105 FM" with WWCK AM 1570 serving as a shadowcast of FM 105. This marked the first time Flint had a 2nd FM CHR/Top 40 Hit music radio station of its own since the days of WTAC 600 AM changed from Top 40 to Country  in 1981. The fans of the old FM 105 era were unhappy with the change, but WWCK's new format took off in the ratings and gain some new fans as in the CHR fanbase as CK 105 posted several number one showings (12+) in the Flint Arbitron reports throughout the 1990s. CK 105.5 is typically still a top ten ratings performer in Flint.

WWCK-FM was once housed at its transmitter location on Lapeer Rd.  During the 1990s WWCK-FM allowed requests at the studio window.
It was also common for wedding parties to stop by the studio for shout outs and such.

References
Michiguide.com - WWCK-FM History

External links
WWCK official website

WCK-FM
Contemporary hit radio stations in the United States
Radio stations established in 1964
Cumulus Media radio stations